George A. O'Toole, Jr. (born October 7, 1947) is a senior United States district judge of the United States District Court for the District of Massachusetts.

Education and career 
Born in Worcester, Massachusetts, O'Toole received a Bachelor of Arts from Boston College in 1969 and a Juris Doctor from Harvard Law School in 1972. He was in private practice in Boston, Massachusetts from 1972 to 1982. He was an associate justice of the Boston Municipal Court from 1982 to 1990, and of the Superior Court of Massachusetts from 1990 to 1995.

Federal judicial service 

On April 4, 1995, O'Toole was nominated by President Bill Clinton to a new seat on the United States District Court for the District of Massachusetts created by 104 Stat. 5089. He was confirmed by the United States Senate on May 25, 1995, and received his commission on May 26, 1995. He assumed senior status on January 1, 2018.

Notable decision 
O'Toole presided over the 2015 trial of Dzhokhar Tsarnaev, one of the perpetrators of the Boston Marathon bombing.

Personal life 

He is married to Lucy A. Flynn, a local banker, businesswoman, and community activist. They have two sons, George and John.

References

Sources

 

1947 births
Living people
Boston College alumni
Harvard Law School alumni
Judges of the United States District Court for the District of Massachusetts
Massachusetts state court judges
Massachusetts Superior Court justices
People from Worcester, Massachusetts
United States district court judges appointed by Bill Clinton
20th-century American judges
21st-century American judges